Johan Sihver (9 July 1882 Vana-Tänassilma Parish, Viljandi County – 27 January 1942 Solikamsk, Russia) was an Estonian politician. He was a member of IV Riigikogu.

References

1882 births
1942 deaths
Members of the Riigikogu, 1929–1932
People from Viljandi County
Estonian people who died in Soviet detention
People who died in the Gulag
Members of the Riiginõukogu
Members of the Riigikogu, 1932–1934